Robert Ralph Skinner (born October 3, 1931) is an American former professional baseball outfielder / first baseman, manager, coach, and scout, who played in Major League Baseball (MLB) for three National League (NL) teams. In all, Skinner spent over 50 years in the game.

Career
He is a native of La Jolla, California.

He played most of his career with the Pittsburgh Pirates (1954; 1956–63), signing with them  in 1951. Skinner spent his last  years as a pinch hitter and backup outfielder for the Cincinnati Reds (1963–64) and St. Louis Cardinals (1964–66). During his best season, 1962 with the Pirates, he batted .302 and hit 20 home runs. Over his 12-year career, he batted .277 with 1,198 hits, including 197 doubles, 58 triples and 103 homers. He played for two World Series champions in two tries. In the 1960 World Series with Pittsburgh, he was injured in game 1 and unable to return until game 7. He had 1 hit in 5 at bats plus a walk, a hit-by-pitch and a stolen base. As a pinch hitter for St. Louis during the 1964 World Series, Skinner hit safely in two of three at-bats for a .667 average.

In 1967, Skinner retired from playing and became manager of his hometown team, the San Diego Padres of the Triple-A Pacific Coast League, the top farm club of the Philadelphia Phillies. He led San Diego to an 85–63 record and the 1967 PCL championship, winning Minor League Manager of the Year honors from The Sporting News. In , he began the year at San Diego but on June 16 he was called to the Phillies to replace Gene Mauch as manager with the Phils in fifth place with a record of 27–27.

He remained in the game, however, as a coach for the National League Padres, who came into being in 1969, Pirates, California Angels and Atlanta Braves.  He also managed the Houston Astros' Tucson Toros PCL franchise from 1989–92 before becoming a Houston scout.

His career record as a manager, including a one-game interim stint with the 1977 Padres, was 93–123 (.431).

In 1976, Skinner was also inducted by the San Diego Hall of Champions into the Breitbard Hall of Fame honoring San Diego's finest athletes both on and off the playing surface.

Career Statistics

Skinner played 893 games at left field, 151 games at first base, 56 games at right field and 2 games at third base.

Personal life
Skinner is the father of former MLB catcher and coach Joel Skinner.

External links

Bob Skinner at SABR (Baseball BioProject)
Bob Skinner at Baseball Almanac
Bob Skinner at Baseballbiography.com
Bob Skinner at Pura Pelota (Venezuelan Professional Baseball League)

1931 births
Living people
American military personnel of the Korean War
Atlanta Braves coaches
Baseball players from California
California Angels coaches
Cincinnati Reds players
Houston Astros scouts
Major League Baseball first basemen
Major League Baseball hitting coaches
Major League Baseball outfielders
Mayfield Clothiers players
Minor league baseball managers
National League All-Stars
Navegantes del Magallanes players
American expatriate baseball players in Venezuela
New Orleans Pelicans (baseball) players
People from La Jolla, San Diego
Philadelphia Phillies managers
Pittsburgh Pirates coaches
Pittsburgh Pirates players
San Diego Padres coaches
San Diego Padres managers
St. Louis Cardinals players
Waco Pirates players